Scinax kennedyi is a species of frog in the family Hylidae.
It is found in Colombia and Venezuela.
Its natural habitats are moist savanna, subtropical or tropical dry lowland grassland, subtropical or tropical seasonally wet or flooded lowland grassland, freshwater marshes, intermittent freshwater marshes, freshwater springs, and pastureland.
It is threatened by habitat loss.

References

kennedyi
Amphibians of Colombia
Amphibians of Venezuela
Amphibians described in 1973
Taxonomy articles created by Polbot